The Snow Leopard award was a Soviet mountaineering award, given to highly skilled mountain climbers. It is still recognized in the Commonwealth of Independent States.

The peaks

The Snow Leopard peaks include:
Ismoil Somoni Peak 
Jengish Chokusu 
Ibn Sina Peak 
Peak Korzhenevskaya 
Khan Tengri 

In Tajikistan's Pamir Mountains there are three Snow Leopard peaks, Ismail Samani Peak (formerly Communism Peak) , Peak Korzhenevskaya , and Ibn Sina Peak (formerly Lenin Peak)  on the Kyrgyzstan-Tajikistan border.

In the Tian Shan there are two Snow Leopard peaks, Jengish Chokusu (formerly Peak Pobeda)  in Kyrgyzstan (divided by the border with China), and Khan Tengri  on the Kyrgyzstan-Kazakhstan border. For this reason, it is considered a  peak.

In order of difficulty, Peak Pobeda is by far the most difficult and dangerous, followed by Khan Tengri, Ismail Samani Peak, Peak Korzhenevskaya, and Lenin (Ibn Sina) Peak.

Recipients
There are more than 600 climbers, including 31 women, who have received this award between 1961 and 2012 (although not all of them completed the five peaks).

Records 
 Boris Korshunov (Russia) – nine times Snow Leopard (1981 – 2004)
 Boris Korshunov (Russia) – last award at the age of 69
 Andrzej Bargiel (Poland) – all five ascents in 29 days 17 hours 5 minutes (time counted from leaving the Advanced Base Camp under Lenin Peak, 15 July 2016)

Further reading 
 The Snow Leopard mountains at Summitpost

References 

Mountaineering awards
Soviet awards
Mountaineering in the Soviet Union